Boyd's Windmill, also known as Boyd's Wind Grist Mill, is a historic smock mill at Paradise Valley Park on Prospect Avenue in Middletown, Rhode Island. John Peterson built the windmill at the corner of Mill Lane and West Main Rd. in Portsmouth, Rhode Island in 1810, and William Boyd purchased it in 1815. It originally had four common sails, but four more were added by the family. The grindstones in the middle of the mill are Fall River granite; the upper one, which is connected to the power mechanisms, rotates six times for each turn of the mill's main shaft. In 1916 Benjamin Boyd removed the original vanes and powered the mill using a gasoline engine. It is one of only two historic windmills (out of what was estimated to be more than thirty) to survive on Aquidneck Island.

Boyd's Mill features prominently on the town seal of Middletown.

The windmill was restored by the Middletown Historical Society after receiving it as a donation in 1990 and moving it to Paradise Valley Park in Middletown.  The windmill is open to the public on Sunday afternoons in July, August and September.

It was listed on the National Register of Historic Places in 2001.

See also

National Register of Historic Places listings in Newport County, Rhode Island

References

External links
Boyd Windmill History
Middletown Historical Society

Agricultural buildings and structures on the National Register of Historic Places in Rhode Island
Mill museums in the United States
Windmills completed in 1810
Museums in Newport County, Rhode Island
Smock mills in the United States
Windmills
Industry museums in Rhode Island
Agricultural buildings and structures on the National Register of Historic Places
Octagonal buildings in the United States
Buildings and structures in Middletown, Rhode Island
Windmills in Rhode Island
National Register of Historic Places in Newport County, Rhode Island
1810 establishments in Rhode Island
Windmills on the National Register of Historic Places